Seyyedlu (also Romanized as Seyyedlū; also known as Sa‘īdlū and Sūyedlū) is a village in Koshksaray Rural District, in the Central District of Marand County, East Azerbaijan Province, Iran. At the 2006 census, its population was 227, in 66 families.

References 

Populated places in Marand County